Chris Evert Lloyd defeated Hana Mandlíková in the final, 6–2, 6–2 to win the ladies' singles tennis title at the 1981 Wimbledon Championships. It was her third Wimbledon singles title and her twelfth major singles title, surpassing Margaret Court's Open Era record.

Evonne Goolagong Cawley was the reigning champion, but did not compete due to pregnancy.

Seeds

  Chris Evert Lloyd (champion)
  Hana Mandlíková (final)
  Tracy Austin (quarterfinals)
  Martina Navratilova (semifinals)
  Andrea Jaeger (fourth round)
  Wendy Turnbull (quarterfinals)
  Pam Shriver (semifinals)
  Virginia Ruzici (quarterfinals)
  Sylvia Hanika (first round)
  Mima Jaušovec (quarterfinals)
  Dianne Fromholtz (third round)
  Kathy Jordan (fourth round)
  Bettina Bunge (second round)
  Barbara Potter (fourth round)
  Regina Maršíková (first round)
  JoAnne Russell (first round)

Hana Mandlíková was seeded second, higher than her then current ranking of 5th at the start of the championship, due to her victories in the previous two grand slam singles events in Australia and France. Although perfectly within their remit and rights to alter the seedings from the rankings as they saw fit, the All England Club were petitioned by the WTA, which complained about the arrangement.

Qualifying

Draw

Finals

Top half

Section 1

Section 2

Section 3

Section 4

Bottom half

Section 5

Section 6

Section 7

Section 8

References

External links

1981 Wimbledon Championships – Women's draws and results at the International Tennis Federation

Women's Singles
Wimbledon Championship by year – Women's singles
Wimbledon Championships
Wimbledon Championships